Daniel Alejandro Islas (born 19 February 1979) is an Argentine football goalkeeper.

Career

Islas started his professional career in 1997 with Club Atlético Independiente of the Primera División Argentina. In 1999, he dropped down a division to join Club Atlético Tigre where he played until 2002 and then Los Andes between 2002 and 2003.

In 2003 Islas returned to the Primera División with Nueva Chicago but the club were relegated at the end of the 2003-2004 season, he stayed with the club for another season in the Argentine 2nd division. In 2005, he joined Huracán de Tres Arroyos.

In 2007 Islas returned for a second spell with Tigre, he helped the club to gain promotion to the Primera. In Apertura 2007 he was the first team goalkeeper, helping the club to finish in second place, the highest league finish in the club's history. On 5 June 2011, during a match with Huracán, he sprained his ankle. Islas' convalescence would require up to seven months for complete recovery.

Notes

External links
 Argentine Primera statistics at Fútbol XXI  
 Football-Lineups player profile
 Tigre player profile 

1979 births
Living people
Footballers from Buenos Aires
Argentine footballers
Association football goalkeepers
Argentine Primera División players
Club Atlético Independiente footballers
Club Atlético Tigre footballers
Club Atlético Los Andes footballers
Nueva Chicago footballers
Huracán de Tres Arroyos footballers
Club Atlético Huracán footballers
Unión de Santa Fe footballers